1991 in philosophy

Events 
 The philosophy magazine Philosophy Now was founded in 1991. According to the Philosophy Documentation Center it "has become the most widely read philosophy publication in the English-speaking world".

Publications

Monographies and essays 
 Daniel Dennett, Consciousness Explained (1991)
 Bruno Latour, We Have Never Been Modern (1991)
 Robert B. Pippin, Modernism as a Philosophical Problem: On the Dissatisfactions of European High Culture (1991)
 Manuel de Landa, War in the Age of Intelligent Machines (1991)
 David Gelernter, Mirror Worlds (1991)
 Jürgen Habermas, Justification and Application: Remarks on Discourse Ethics (1991, English translation: 1993)
 Thomas Nagel, Equality and Partiality (1991)
 David Lewis, Parts of Classes (1991)

Philosophical fiction 
 Robert M. Pirsig, Lila: An Inquiry into Morals (1991)
 Jostein Gaarder, Sophie's World (1991)

Deaths 
 January 23 - Northrop Frye (born 1912) 
 June 11 - Wolfgang Stegmüller (born 1923)
 June 29 - Henri Lefebvre (born 1901)
 September 4 - Henri de Lubac (born 1896)
 November 27 - Vilém Flusser (born 1920)

References 

Philosophy
20th-century philosophy
Philosophy by year